Chickpea bushy dwarf virus (CpBDV) is a plant pathogenic virus of the family Potyviridae. It was isolated and characterized from a chickpea in 1989 by a group of Indian researchers. Their researched indicated that the virus was sap-transmissible to 14 species of Chenopodiaceae, Leguminosae, Solanaceae and Malvaceae.

References

External links
ICTVdB - The Universal Virus Database: Chickpea bushy dwarf virus
Family Groups - The Baltimore Method

Viral plant pathogens and diseases
Potyviruses
Unaccepted virus taxa